Stibaroma melanotoxa, the grey-caped line-moth, is a species of moth of the family Geometridae first described by Edward Guest in 1887. It is found in Australia.

The larvae feed on Eucalyptus species.

References

Nacophorini